Nalgora is a village and a gram panchayat within the jurisdiction of the Jaynagar police station in the Jaynagar II CD block in the Baruipur subdivision of the South 24 Parganas district in the Indian state of West Bengal.

Geography

Demographics
As per 2011 Census of India, Nalgora had a total population of 10,373.

Transport
A short stretch of local roads link Nalgora to the Jaynagar-Jamtala Road.

Jaynagar Majilpur railway station is located nearby.

Healthcare
There is a primary health centre, with 10 beds, at Nalgora (PO Sonatikri).

References

Villages in South 24 Parganas district
Neighbourhoods in Jaynagar Majilpur